The Cymatoceratidae is a family of  Mesozoic and early Cenozoic nautiloid cephalopods and the most abundant of this kind in the Cretaceous. They are  characterized by ribbed, generally involute shells of varied form - coiled such that the outer whorl envelops the previous, as with Nautilus, and sutures that are variably sinuous.

Cymatoceratids first appear in the Middle Jurassic, derived from the Lower Jurassic Cenoceras (Nautilidae) and extend as far as the Oligocene.

Taxonomy
Ten cymatoceratid genera are described in the Treatise Part K, 1964. First to appear was the large, tightly involute, rapidly expanding Procymatoceras from the Middle Jurassic, followed by the Middle and Upper Jurassic Cymatonautilus   which has a wide umbilicus and subquadrate whorl section. Procymatoceras and Cymatonautilus are followed by Cymatoceras and the similar Paracymatoceras.

Six genera are restricted to the Cretaceous; Eucymatoceras and Heminautilus from the Lower Cretaceous; Anglonautilus from both the Lower and Upper Cretaceous;  Deltocymatoceras, Epicymatoceras, and Syrionautilus. Neocymatoceras from the Oligocene is synonymous with Cymatoceras. 
 
Of the Cymatoceratidae, Cymatoceras has the longest temporal range, extending from the Late Jurassic to the Tertiary Oligocene. The only other to cross a period boundary is Paracymatoceras which lived during both the Late Jurassic and Early Cretaceous.  The others are restricted to a simple period, sometimes to a single epoch.

References

 The Paleobiology Database entry for Cymatoceratidae

Prehistoric nautiloid families
Mesozoic cephalopods
Cenozoic cephalopods
Middle Jurassic first appearances
Oligocene extinctions